Marjorie Morningstar is a 1958 American romantic drama film directed by Irving Rapper from a screenplay by Everett Freeman, based on the 1955 novel of the same name by Herman Wouk. The film tells a fictional coming-of-age story about a young Jewish girl named Marjorie Morgenstern in New York City in the 1950s, chronicling her attempts to become an artist—exemplified through her relationship with the actor and playwright Noel Airman. The film stars Gene Kelly and Natalie Wood, with Claire Trevor, Ed Wynn, Everett Sloane, Martin Milner, and Carolyn Jones.

The central conflict in the film revolves around the traditional models of social behavior and religious behavior expected by New York Jewish families in the 1950s, and Marjorie's desire to follow an unconventional path. The film is notable for its inclusion of Jewish religious scenes—including a Passover meal, a synagogue sequence, and Jewish icons in the Morgenstern house. These depictions were one of the first times Jewish religion was portrayed overtly in film since The Jazz Singer (1927). The film received an Academy Award nomination for Best Song ("A Very Precious Love"), sung by Kelly.

Plot
Marjorie Morgenstern is a student at Hunter College and the girlfriend of an eligible young man, Sandy Lamm, who attends her family's synagogue. Her parents are happy with her choice of mate(department store heir), and her mother Rose Morgenstern (Claire Trevor) tells her father, Arnold (Everett Sloane), that she hopes the two children marry.

Marjorie breaks up with Sandy after he proposes unsuccessfully and goes to the Catskills resort that summer to be a camp counselor. One night, Marjorie and friend Marsha Zelenko (Carolyn Jones) sneak to a Borscht Belt resort for adults called South Wind. Marjorie stumbles into a rehearsal for a dance routine and is noticed hiding in the back by the social director Noel Airman. After watching, and trying to get back to camp, she is caught by resort owner Maxwell Greech (George Tobias), but Noel Airman (Gene Kelly) vouches for Marjorie as a person looking for a job, which he then offers to her. She begins a relationship with Airman and a friendship with aspiring playwright Wally Wronkin (Martin Milner), who writes Airman's stage act. The latter has a romantic interest in Marjorie, but she's tempted by the older, more seasoned Airman, who meets the disapproval of her parents. Airman, whose original name was the more Jewish Ehrman, renames Marjorie as well from Morgenstern to Morningstar.

Marjorie's sweet Uncle Samson (Ed Wynn) comes to the resort to keep an eye on her. Samson intervenes as a waiter to lecture Noel on the character of Marjorie and not to take advantage of her good nature and youth. Noel reconsiders his plan to woo her into bed, and tells Marjorie to leave. He accuses her of wanting to find a husband and argues that he will never be subjected to a life of mediocrity and married suburban life. The relationship goes up and down all summer but they seem to coalescing as a couple until Marjorie's parents appear on a surprise visit. During a lunch, the conversation gets testy as her parents grill Noel on his career plans for the future. The relationship turns sour again, as Noel doesn't want to have anything to do with traditional Jewish life and business aspirations. Later, during a party, Marjorie notices that her uncle is feeling unwell but is distracted by Noel, who professes his uncontrollable attraction for her. When her uncle dies of a heart attack unattended, Marjorie blames herself, and Noel and leaves to go back to the city. A year later, after graduating Hunter College, Marjorie plans to continue her acting career to the chagrin of her parents. She ends up dating a doctor named Harris, with whom she quickly breaks up when Airman returns to find her showing up in a limousine. He declares that love has convinced him to become respectable and conventional. Marjorie tells her mother, who insists her daughter bring him to a Passover meal. "Not Passover, mother. He’s not very religious. He doesn’t believe in those things," Marjorie says. Rose answers, "He doesn’t believe in those things... you’re going to get married. How are you going to raise your children?"

In the midst of the Passover meal, he leaves and Marjorie follows him. She is concerned he's bored, but he says, "I wasn’t bored. I was disturbed, deeply. I couldn’t help thinking of all the things I’ve missed in life. Family, your kind of family. Faith, tradition. All the things I’ve been ridiculing all the time. That’s why I couldn’t take it anymore. I love you very much, Marjorie Morgenstern."

Airman gets a job at an advertising firm and seems to do well, but one week he doesn't show up at work and refuses to take Marjorie's calls. She goes to his apartment and finds him drunk with a strange woman, Imogene Norman. He has decided he cannot stand the professional lifestyle and wants to be an artist. The impetus to change careers is the success of Wally Wronkin on Broadway; the playwright has launched a series of hits and Airman is consumed with jealousy. Upon admitting he hates his conventional job and his anger towards himself, Marjorie convinces her girlfriend's new husband to invest in his play. Wally and the investors critique the play's ending as being depressing and not viable, but in a fit of rage Noel refuses to make the changes required to appease them. Despite Airman's outbursts, the investors are convinced to back the play with Wally's lukewarm assurances that it was viable enough. The play is panned by critics and is a flop.  "We were crucified," the investor explains to Marjorie. The relationship with Noel is unable to survive, and he runs away, again, this time leaving her a note saying he is on his way to Europe. She travels to Europe to search for him. In London, she meets Wally who tells her Noel is back at South Wind, the resort where they first met.

Marjorie returns to South Wind, where she watches Noel rehearsing a new summer show. Everything is exactly the same as it was, her first summer there, except for herself. Greech observes that she's done some growing up. We see her board a bus. In the rearview mirror, Wronkin sits in back. He smiles, as he's been waiting for her to get over her summer fling. The suggestion is that they will embark on the relationship for which Wronkin had been hoping from the beginning.

Cast

Production
The film was mainly shot at Scaroon Manor in upstate New York. The footage of fictitious Camp Tamarack was filmed at Camp Cayuga, Schroon Lake, N.Y. in Essex County, N.Y. Part of the film was filmed in Glens Falls, N.Y. and Warren County, N.Y.

Natalie Wood, who would later go on to her greatest hit, West Side Story, had until Marjorie Morningstar played mostly childish roles, including that of Judy in Rebel Without a Cause. A New York Times reviewer wrote of her performance, "Natalie Wood, who only yesterday was playing with dolls in films, has blossomed into a vivacious pretty brunette who very likely is as close to a personification of Marjorie as one could wish. But the character is hardly complex, and while Miss Wood is competent in the role, it is rarely a glowing performance."

Gene Kelly was near the end of his film career when he appeared in Marjorie Morningstar. His 15-year association with Metro-Goldwyn-Mayer had ended the previous year. Born in 1912, he was 46 when he took the role of Noel Airman. By contrast, his love interest Wood was only 20 years old. The Times noted: "Although Mr. Kelly appears a mite uncomfortable in his assignment, he plays it with understanding. And, as a professional song-and-dance man, he both hoofs with polish and pleasingly warbles 'A Very Precious Love,' the film's theme number."

Times critiques of the other performances: "Carolyn Jones, as Miss Wood's best friend, makes it an outspoken performance marked by one truly poignant scene in which she reveals her essential loneliness. Ed Wynn, in the comparatively short role of an impecunious but understanding relative, adds some glint of humor and compassion. Claire Trevor, as Marjorie's over-protective mother and Martin Milner, as the playwright, who is one of Marjorie's retinue of devoted suitors, are well-turned, if not inspired, characterizations."

Differences between the film and novel
The most significant difference between the 1955 novel and the 1958 film is the ending. At the end of the novel, the free-spirited Marjorie Morningstar settles down with a man agreeable to her parents. In a criticism of Herman Wouk's ending, Alana Newhouse writes in Slate Magazine that "In the final nine pages, the formerly vibrant Marjorie gives up on her career, gets married to a man named Sidney—er, Milton—Schwartz, and moves to Westchester... Most female readers cry when they reach the end of this book, and for good reason. Marjorie Morningstar, as they came to know her, has become another woman entirely: 'You couldn't write a play about her that would run a week, or a novel that would sell a thousand copies. … The only remarkable thing about Mrs. Schwartz is that she ever hoped to be remarkable, that she ever dreamed of being Marjorie Morningstar.'"

The film's ending suggests a possible relationship between Marjorie and Wally Wronkin, the playwright. Although he is successful, he is far more artistic than the Milton Schwartz that Marjorie settles for at the end of the novel. This ending suggests a different conceit in the film than Wouk's novel. The novel suggests that people grow up to realize they have no real choice but to follow their family and upbringing. The film's ending suggests that maturity implies assuming responsibility for one's choices and finishing what was started. Wally had been waiting for Marjorie to learn that Noel will never mature in this sense. In the novel the moral seems to be that her only solution is to settle, as her Mother warns her, for someone to take care of her. In the movie, she begins a new journey.

The film is also contemporary, set in the late 1950s, whereas the novel is set in the 1930s.

Awards and nominations

See also
 List of American films of 1958

References

Sources
 Popkin, Henry. The Vanishing Jew of Our Popular Culture: The Little Man Is No Longer There.
 Prell, Riv-Ellen. Fighting to Become Americans: Jews, Gender, and the Anxiety of Assimilation. Beacon Press, Boston.
 Dundes, Alex. The J. A. P. and the J. A. M. in American Jokelore. The Journal of American Folklore > Vol. 98, No. 390 (Oct., 1985), pp. 456–475
 Weiler, A.H. Version of Wouk Novel Opens at Music Hall. NY Times, page 32, April 25, 1959.
 Tanabe, Kunio Francis. The Washington Post Book Club - Marjorie Morningstar' by Herman Wouk/ The Washington Post, page BW13, July 4, 2004.
 Newhouse, Alana. Why Do Women Love Marjorie Morningstar? Slate Magazine, Sept. 14, 2005.
 Heifetz, Laurie. Scarlett's Falling Morningstar The Forward, May 11, 2007.

External links
 
 
 
 

1958 films
1958 romantic drama films
1950s English-language films
American romantic drama films
Films about Jews and Judaism
Films about summer camps
Films based on American novels
Films based on romance novels
Films based on works by Herman Wouk
Films directed by Irving Rapper
Films scored by Max Steiner
Films set in New York (state)
Films shot in New York (state)
Warner Bros. films
1950s American films